Michael 'Moegie' Maher is an Irish politician, who served was the Mayor of County Galway from 2011 to 2012, and again since June 2022.

A native of Loughrea, Maher entered politics as a member of Loughrea Town Council in 2004, joining Galway County Council in 2007. Re-elected in 2009, he became a full-time councillor in 2010. In June, 2011, he replaced Jimmy McClearn as Mayor of County Galway.

Maher advocates volunteer work, and supports both the Order of Malta and the Scouting movement, being a former County Secretary for Scouting Ireland. Maher is a supporter of Connacht Rugby, stewarding at home games in the Sportsground.

References

External links
 https://web.archive.org/web/20110619034645/http://www.galwaynews.ie/20016-mogie-maher-new-mayor-county-galway
 http://archive.galwayindependent.com/index.php?option=com_content&task=view&id=28188&Itemid=91
 https://web.archive.org/web/20120624045608/http://www.galway.ie/en/AboutYourCouncil/Councillors/MeettheCouncillors/LoughreaElectoralArea/

Politicians from County Galway
Living people
Fine Gael politicians
Local councillors in County Galway
Year of birth missing (living people)